Stéblová is a municipality and village in Pardubice District in the Pardubice Region of the Czech Republic. It has about 300 inhabitants.

History
The first written mention of Stéblová is from 1385.

In 1960, Stéblová was the site of the Stéblová train disaster, the largest railway accident in Bohemia. 118 people died.

References

External links

Villages in Pardubice District